Tan Jin Eong (born 1927; died 2 November 2014) was a Malaysian badminton player from Ipoh, Perak.

Early life 
Tan was born in Ipoh, Perak, Malaya. He was the son of badminton star Tan Cheng Phor. His sister, Tan Eng Looi, was a badminton player as well.

Career 
Tan was part of the Malayan team that won the 1955 Thomas Cup. He partnered Lim Kee Fong in the doubles. In the final against Denmark, they played against Ole Mertz and Ove Eilertsen in the first doubles and won it in straight sets (15-9, 15-3). In the second doubles, they faced Finn Kobberø and Jørgen Hammergaard Hansen but lost to them in a hard fought three setter (13-18, 15-4, 6-15). It turned out to be the only victory for the Danes as Malaya won the cup with the scoreline of 8:1. 

In his native Perak, Tan won numerous national titles. In 1949, he won in all three disciplines (singles, doubles and mixed doubles).

Personal life 
Tan was married to Mary Ooi Siew Khim.

Death 
Tan died on 2 November 2014, aged 87, at Kinta Medical Centre in Ipoh due to kidney failure.

References

1927 births
Malaysian male badminton players
2014 deaths
People from Ipoh
Malaysian sportspeople of Chinese descent